The 2009–10 Grand Prix of Figure Skating Final was a figure skating competition in the 2009–10 season. It was the culminating competition of the 2009–10 ISU Grand Prix of Figure Skating, a senior-level international invitational competition, and the 2009–10 ISU Junior Grand Prix, a junior-level international competition.

Skaters earned points towards qualifying for the senior Grand Prix Final at the 2009 Trophée Eric Bompard, the 2009 NHK Trophy, the 2009 Rostelecom Cup, the 2009 Cup of China, the 2009 Skate America, and the 2009 Skate Canada International. Skaters earned points towards qualifying for the Junior Grand Prix Final at each of the seven Junior Grand Prix events. The six highest ranking skaters/teams from the Grand Prix series and the eight highest ranking skaters/teams from the Junior Grand Prix met at the Grand Prix Final.

The event was held in Tokyo, Japan from December 2 to December 6, 2009. Medals were awarded in the disciplines of men's singles, ladies' singles, pair skating, and ice dancing on the senior and junior levels.

Unlike the other events in both series, there was no compulsory dance portion of the competition. Ice dancers were ranked in the original dance starting order in reverse order of their qualification to the Final.

Schedule
All times are Japan Standard Time (UTC+9).

 Wednesday, December 2
 19:30 Opening ceremony
 Thursday, December 3
 17:00 Junior pairs – Short program
 18:30 Junior men – Short program
 20:00 Senior pairs – Short program
 21:15 Senior ice dancing – Original dance
 Friday, December 4
 15:00 Junior men – Free skating
 16:35 Junior pairs – Free skating
 18:30 Senior men – Short program
 19:40 Senior ladies – Short program
 20:50 Senior ice dancing – Free dance
 Saturday, December 5
 13:30 Junior ice dancing – Original dance
 14:55 Junior ladies – Short program
 16:25 Senior pairs – Free skating
 18:00 Senior men – Free skating
 19:30 Senior ladies – Free skating
 Sunday, December 6
 12:30 Junior ice dancing – Free dance
 14:00 Junior ladies – Free skating
 16:15 Exhibition gala

Qualifiers

Senior-level qualifiers
The following skaters qualified for the Grand Prix Final, in order of qualification.

 Tanith Belbin / Benjamin Agosto, the third qualifiers in the ice dancing event, withdrew due to illness (Belbin). They were replaced by second alternates Vanessa Crone / Paul Poirier after the first alternates, Jana Khokhlova / Sergei Novitski, withdrew due to illness (Novitski).
 Brian Joubert, the third qualifier in the men's event, withdrew due to injury. He was replaced by first alternate Tomáš Verner.

Junior-level qualifiers
The following skaters qualified for the Junior Grand Prix Final, in order of qualification.

Medals table

Senior-level results

Men

Ladies

Pairs
Shen Xue / Zhao Hongbo set a new short program world record of 75.36, a new free skating world record of 138.89, and a new combined total score of 214.25.

Ice dancing

Junior-level results

Junior men

Junior ladies

Junior pairs

Junior ice dancing

References

External links

 
 
 

2009 in figure skating
2009-10
2009-10
Figure skating in Japan
2009 in youth sport
2010 in youth sport
December 2009 sports events in Japan
2009 in Japanese sport